Mats Johan Sundin (born 13 February 1971) is a Swedish former professional ice hockey player who played the majority of his career in the National Hockey League (NHL), retiring in 2009. Originally drafted first overall in 1989, Sundin played his first four seasons in the NHL with the Quebec Nordiques. He was then traded to the Toronto Maple Leafs in 1994, where he played the majority of his career, serving 11 seasons as team captain. At the end of the 2007–08 season, Sundin was the longest-serving non-North American-born captain in NHL history. Sundin last played for the Vancouver Canucks in the 2008–09 season before announcing his retirement on 30 September 2009. He appeared in the Stanley Cup playoffs in 10 of his 18 seasons.

Excluding his rookie season, the shortened lockout season and his half-season with Vancouver, Sundin scored at least 70 points in every season of his career, played at least 70 games in every season and led the Maple Leafs in points in every year he was with the team, with the exception of the 2002–03 season, when Alexander Mogilny surpassed him by seven points. On 14 October 2006, Sundin became the first Swedish player to score 500 goals. He is the Maple Leafs' franchise all-time leader in goals (420) and points (987).  Over his career, Sundin averaged just over a point per game (1,349 points in 1,346 NHL games).

Internationally, Sundin won three gold medals with Sweden at the World Championships and was the team captain for Sweden's gold medal at the 2006 Winter Olympics in Turin.

Sundin was elected to the Hockey Hall of Fame on 26 June 2012, in his first year of eligibility. He became the second Swede, following Börje Salming (another long-time Maple Leafs player), to be chosen to the Hall of Fame. Sundin was also inducted into the IIHF Hall of Fame in 2013. In 2017 Sundin was named one of the '100 Greatest NHL Players' in history.

Playing career

Quebec Nordiques
Sundin was drafted by the  Quebec Nordiques with the first overall pick in the 1989 NHL Entry Draft, becoming the first European-born player drafted first overall in NHL history.  At the time, Sundin was playing in the Swedish second-tier Allsvenskan for Nacka HK. He played the following season in Sweden's Elitserien for Djurgårdens IF, helping the club to the Le Mat Trophy as league champions.

Sundin made his NHL debut with Quebec during the 1990–91 season, finishing second on the team behind Joe Sakic with 59 points. He scored his first career NHL goal against the Hartford Whalers in his first NHL game on 4 October 1990. After improving to 76 points in his second NHL season, he led the Nordiques with a career-high 114 points in 1992–93, emerging as one of the League's premier young players. During this season he recorded a 30-game point streak, tied for 4th longest in league history. He played one more season with the Nordiques, recording 85 points in 84 games, before being dealt to the Toronto Maple Leafs at the 1994 Draft.

Toronto Maple Leafs
The Maple Leafs acquired Sundin in a trade on 28 June 1994. The Nordiques sent Sundin, Garth Butcher, Todd Warriner and a 1994 first-round draft pick (acquired through the 1992 Eric Lindros deal, traded to the Washington Capitals, used to pick Nolan Baumgartner) to Toronto in exchange for Wendel Clark, Sylvain Lefebvre, Landon Wilson and a 1994 first-round draft pick (used to pick Jeff Kealty). However, as a result of the 1994–95 lockout, Sundin's Toronto debut was delayed and he returned to Sweden to play again for Djurgårdens IF. When NHL play resumed later that season, Sundin made an immediate impact, leading the Leafs in scoring at a point-per-game pace with 47 points. 

In his third season with the Maple Leafs, Sundin recorded a 41-goal, 94-point season, the second-highest of his career and the most prolific during his tenure in Toronto.  With the departure of team captain Doug Gilmour to the New Jersey Devils during the 1996–97 season, Sundin was named Gilmour's successor, becoming the 16th Maple Leafs captain and first European captain in team history.

After an 83-point campaign in 1998–99, Sundin led the Maple Leafs into the 1999 Stanley Cup playoffs as the fourth seed in Eastern Conference. Bolstered by the acquisitions of forward Steve Thomas and goaltender Curtis Joseph in the previous off-season, the Leafs made it to the Conference Finals against the seventh-seeded Buffalo Sabres, but were defeated in five games. Sundin finished with a career-playoff-high 16 points in 17 playoff contests. Sundin made another appearance in the Eastern Conference Finals with the Maple Leafs again in 2001–02, but lost to the Carolina Hurricanes in six games.

In 2002–03, after eight consecutive years as the Maple Leafs' leading scorer in the regular season, Sundin was succeeded by Alexander Mogilny, who topped Sundin's 72 points with 79.  The following season, Mogilny suffered a serious hip injury that required him to miss 12 weeks, allowing Sundin to reclaim his spot as top scorer for the Maple Leafs that season.

During the 2003–04 campaign, however, Sundin was the subject of League controversy with his infamous stick-throwing incident on 8 January 2004, against the Nashville Predators. Breaking his stick on an attempted shot, Sundin threw it aside in disgust. Instead of hitting the glass, the stick inadvertently entered the crowd. Deemed a reckless act by the NHL, Sundin was subsequently assigned a one-game suspension.  After the game, as an apology, he gave a brand new autographed stick to the fan that had caught the broken stick.

As a result of the ensuing 2004–05 NHL lockout, Sundin spent the next season inactive, opting not to play in Sweden like many of his countrymen. When NHL play resumed for 2005–06, Sundin was sidelined in the first game of the season when he was struck in the face with a puck, narrowly missing his eye, but breaking his orbital bone. He returned to the lineup after a month to lead the team in scoring with 78 points. However, Toronto did not meet the same success and missed the playoffs for the first time in seven years in 2006. It would also mark the first of Sundin's last three years with the Leafs without a post-season appearance.

Near the beginning of the 2006–07 season, Sundin became just the 35th player in NHL history to reach the 500-goal mark. He achieved the milestone on 14 October 2006, with a hat-trick effort against Miikka Kiprusoff of the Calgary Flames. He scored the 500th goal with his third mark of the game, shorthanded, over Kiprusoff's blocker in overtime to defeat the Flames 5–4. Later in the season, on 20 March 2007, Sundin reached 900 points as a Maple Leaf with a two-assist effort in a 2–1 win against the New Jersey Devils.

The following season, in 2007–08, Sundin began approaching several team records as a Maple Leaf.  In the second game of the season, on 4 October 2007, against the Ottawa Senators, Sundin scored his 389th goal with the club, tying Darryl Sittler's team record. In Toronto's fifth game of the season, on 11 October, versus the New York Islanders, Sundin scored his 917th point as a Maple Leaf, breaking Sittler's franchise all-time record. In the same game, he also scored his 390th goal in the third period, taking sole possession of the all-time goal-scoring lead.  At the end of the game, he was ceremoniously elected the first, second and third star of the game. On 27 November, in a game against the Montreal Canadiens, Sundin became the first player to score 400 goals as a Leaf. Several days later, on 1 December, in a game against the Pittsburgh Penguins, he broke Babe Dye's 83-year-old Toronto record when he extended his home game point streak to 15 games.

With the Leafs falling out of playoff contention once more towards the end of the season and Sundin's contract set to expire, Sundin was the focus of numerous trade rumors as the NHL trade deadline approached. Maple Leafs management requested that Sundin waive his no-trade clause in order for the team to acquire potential young talent and/or draft picks to secure the team's future.  However, one day before the trade deadline he stated that he would not waive his no-trade clause, claiming that he did not believe in being a "rental player" and that if he won the Stanley Cup, he wanted to do it over the course of an entire season.  He remained with the club and, with 78 points, marked the fourth consecutive year and 12 of 13 years as the Maple Leafs' leading scorer.

Vancouver Canucks

Sundin became a free agent on 1 July 2008, although the Maple Leafs had previously given the Montreal Canadiens special rights to negotiate with him until then. On the day of free agency, newly appointed Vancouver Canucks General Manager Mike Gillis offered Sundin a lucrative two-year, $20 million contract which, if signed, would have made him the highest paid player in the NHL. Attempting to entice him to sign with the Canucks, numerous Vancouver businesses extended Swedish-centred special offers, such as a Volvo and IKEA products. The New York Rangers, Canadiens and Leafs also made contract offers; however, Sundin chose to hold out for the beginning of the season, contemplating retirement. After announcing that he would, in fact, return to the NHL and sign with a team, he narrowed his prospects down to the Rangers and Canucks.  On 18 December 2008 the Canucks announced that Sundin had signed with the club to a one-year, $8.6 million contract. Pro-rated for the remainder of the season, Sundin's salary worked out to $5 million. Taking a $1.4 million pay cut from the Canucks' original yearly offer, Sundin reportedly decreased his contract willingly in order to give the Canucks added salary cap space to potentially bolster their lineup before the end of the season.

Sundin made his Canucks debut on 7 January 2009, in a 4–2 victory over the Edmonton Oilers, and scored his first goal with the club two games later, on 10 January, a powerplay goal in a 4–2 loss to the San Jose Sharks.  Sundin returned to Toronto on 21 February 2009 to play his first game against the Maple Leafs. The return to the Air Canada Centre became highly emotional when a video tribute was paid to the Leafs' franchise leader during a break in the first period followed by a standing ovation. The game was decided by a shootout with Sundin scoring the winning goal against his former team resulting in a 3–2 win for Vancouver.  Having established himself as a point-per-game player throughout his career, Sundin was criticized for his regular-season play, managing just 28 points in 41 games while playing mostly on the second line with Pavol Demitra and Ryan Kesler, Sundin returned to point-per-game form in the 2009 playoffs, however, as the Canucks entered the post-season as the Northwest Division champions. He missed the final two games of the Canucks' first-round sweep against the St. Louis Blues with a suspected hip injury after falling awkwardly behind the net in Game 2, but returned in time for the second round against the Chicago Blackhawks. As the Canucks were eliminated in six games, Sundin finished the playoffs with eight points in eight games.

Retirement

On 30 September 2009, Sundin announced his retirement at a press conference in Stockholm.

Sundin was honoured on 29 October 2011, more than two years after his retirement, at a Toronto Maple Leafs home game against the Pittsburgh Penguins. His number 13 jersey was honoured by the organization in a ceremony prior to a home game against the Montreal Canadiens on 11 February 2012.

On 12 November 2012, Sundin was inducted into the Hockey Hall of Fame alongside Joe Sakic, Adam Oates and Pavel Bure. In November 2013, Sundin was named as an inductee into the IIHF Hall of Fame, alongside Peter Forsberg, Danielle Goyette, Paul Henderson, Teppo Numminen.

On 10 September 2015, it was announced that Mats Sundin would be added to "Legends Row", a statue outside the Air Canada Centre consisting of 12 of the best players in the franchise's history.

On 15 October 2016, Sundin's number 13 jersey was officially retired by the Toronto Maple Leafs in a ceremony prior to their centenary season home opening game against Boston. A few months later, Sundin was named one of the 100 greatest players in league history by the NHL itself.

International play
Sundin represented Sweden at various international competitions, including the World Cup and the Winter Olympics, and held the position of team captain for the national squad for the nearly ten years. Sundin was widely recognized as one of the top players in the world in these international competitions, and added a highly impressive list of accomplishments to his credentials as a result of his outstanding performance in the 2002 Winter Olympics and 2004 World Cup. Sundin won three IIHF World Championships with Sweden in 1991, 1992 and 1998. Sundin finally clinched an Olympic gold medal with Sweden in 2006 in Turin.

A picture of his "fighting face" when Sweden turned a 5–1 deficit into a 6–5 win over Finland during a World Championship game has become iconic. Sundin was the captain of the Swedish national team in the 2006 Winter Olympics, leading them to a gold medal with a 3–2 victory over Finland in the final.

Sundin played for Sweden in:

1989 European Junior Championships
1990 European Junior Championships
1990 World Junior Championships (silver medal)
1991 Canada Cup
1991 World Championships (gold medal)
1992 World Championships (gold medal)
1994 World Championships (bronze medal)
1996 World Cup of Hockey
1998 World Championships (gold medal)
1998 Winter Olympics
2001 World Championships
2002 Winter Olympics
2003 World Championships (silver medal)
2004 World Cup of Hockey
2006 Winter Olympics (gold medal)

Personal life
The City of Toronto is home to an intense hockey media, and since Sundin is a private individual, he was arguably the most scrutinized athlete in the city. He regularly deflected any probes into his personal life, and rarely spoke negatively of his teammates in public. In May 2006, Sundin put his four-bedroom house up for sale for a price of $6.499 million, which led to a flurry of media speculation that he was unhappy with the Leafs and sought to move (and play) somewhere else. However, Sundin and his longtime girlfriend Tina Fagerström had parted ways, and Maple Leaf Sports & Entertainment CEO Richard Peddie simply commented that the real estate market was very hot, and that Sundin's house was "an awfully big house for a single guy." Sundin played with the Leafs the following NHL season. On 30 April 2008, Sundin was receiving a leadership award at Our Lady of Lourdes Catholic High School in Guelph, Ontario, when he announced that he and his girlfriend Josephine Johansson were engaged to be married. The two had been dating for about a year.

In September 2008, Sundin announced an endorsement deal with PokerStars. He plays under the username "MatsSundin" and will donate any earnings to charity.

On 29 August 2009, Sundin married fiancée Josephine Johansson. The guest list exceeded 200 people and included several current and former teammates. He and Josephine are the parents of daughter Bonnie, and two sons, Nathanael and Julian.

Sundin was also a Goodwill Ambassador for the Adopt-A-Minefield Campaign; an organization that raises awareness and funds to end the human and economic suffering caused by anti-personnel landmines.

Sundin was a partner in a Standardbred harness racing horse named Rotation, which in 2003 won the prestigious Maple Leaf Trot at Mohawk Racetrack.

Records

NHL
 Tied-23rd in career goals (564, shared with Joe Nieuwendyk)
 35th in career assists (785)
 28th all-time in career points (1,349)
 First European-born and trained player to be drafted first overall in the NHL Entry Draft (1989 by the Quebec Nordiques)
 Only Swedish player to reach the 500 goal milestone (564)
 Most career points and goals by a Swedish hockey player
 Tied fastest overtime goal (6 seconds, shared with Alexander Ovechkin, Simon Gagné and David Legwand and William Nylander)
 First Swedish player to reach 1,000 points
 One of three players (Marcel Dionne, Jaromír Jágr) to record at least 20 goals in each of his first 17 NHL seasons

Toronto Maple Leafs
 Goals (420)
 Assists by a forward (567)
 Points (987)
 Assists in a period (3, tied with Morgan Rielly, Darcy Tucker, Matt Stajan and Clarke MacArthur)

Awards and achievements

 TV-pucken Champion as part of Team Stockholm 1986.
 Swedish Champion in 1990.
 First European-born player to be drafted first overall in the NHL Entry Draft. (1989)
 Named to the Elitserien World All-Star Team in 1991, 1992, 1994, 1997, 1998 and 2002.
 Recipient of the Viking Award in 1993, 1994, 1997 and 2002.
 Named to the World Championships All-Star Team in 1992 and 2003.
 World Championships' Best Forward in 1992 and 2003.
 Named to the Canada Cup All-Star Team in 1991.
 Named to the World Cup of Hockey All-Star Team in 1996.
 Played in the NHL All-Star Game in 1996, 1997, 1998, 1999, 2000, 2001, 2002, 2003 (injured) and 2004.
 Named to the NHL Second All-Star Team in 2002 and 2004.
 Named to the Olympic Tournament All-Star Team in 2002.
 Captain of the Swedish national ice hockey team in the 2006 Olympics in which Sweden won the gold medal.
 Achieved 500 goal plateau on 14 October 2006, with a short-handed, hat trick, overtime winner.
 Achieved 1,300 points on 7 February 2008 against the Montreal Canadiens.
 Awarded the "Mark Messier Leadership Award" in 2008.
 Enshrined in the Hockey Hall of Fame in the class of 2012 in his first year of eligibility.
 Number (13) Retired by the Toronto Maple Leafs.
 Named one of the 100 Greatest Players in league history by the NHL.

Career statistics

Regular season and playoffs

International

See also
 List of Swedes in sports
 List of NHL players with 500 goals
 List of NHL players with 1000 points
 List of NHL players with 1000 games played
 List of NHL players with 100 point seasons
 List of NHL statistical leaders
 List of players with five or more goals in an NHL game

References

External links

 

1971 births
Living people
Canadian racehorse owners and breeders
Djurgårdens IF Hockey players
Hockey Hall of Fame inductees
Ice hockey players at the 1998 Winter Olympics
Ice hockey players at the 2002 Winter Olympics
Ice hockey players at the 2006 Winter Olympics
IIHF Hall of Fame inductees
Medalists at the 2006 Winter Olympics
Nacka HK players
National Hockey League All-Stars
National Hockey League first-overall draft picks
National Hockey League first-round draft picks
Olympic gold medalists for Sweden
Olympic ice hockey players of Sweden
Olympic medalists in ice hockey
Quebec Nordiques draft picks
Quebec Nordiques players
Ice hockey people from Stockholm
Swedish emigrants to Canada
Swedish expatriate ice hockey players in Canada
Swedish ice hockey centres
Toronto Maple Leafs players
Vancouver Canucks players